is a Japanese footballer who plays for Kagoshima United FC.

Club statistics
Updated to 23 February 2016.

References

External links

Profile at Kagoshima United FC

1985 births
Living people
Kansai Gaidai University alumni
Association football people from Osaka Prefecture
Japanese footballers
J3 League players
Japan Football League players
AC Nagano Parceiro players
SP Kyoto FC players
Kagoshima United FC players
Association football defenders